Sarah Ann is a census-designated place (CDP) in Logan County, West Virginia, United States. The CDP includes the unincorporated community of Sarah Ann, plus the neighboring communities of Crystal Block and part of Stirrat. As of the 2010 census, the population of the CDP was 345.

Geography
Sarah Ann is located in southwestern Logan County along West Virginia Route 44 in the valley of Island Creek. WV-44 leads north (downstream)  to Logan, the county seat, and south  to U.S. Route 52 at the head of the valley. Sarah Ann has a post office with ZIP code 25644.

History
The community was named for Sarah O'Toole, wife of coal company official Edward O'Toole, and Ann Shanklin, wife of the coal company's coal town doctor, Doctor Shanklin.

References

Census-designated places in Logan County, West Virginia
Census-designated places in West Virginia
Coal towns in West Virginia